is one of 24 wards of Osaka, Japan.

Education

It has a North Korean school, Osaka Fukushima Korean Elementary School (大阪福島朝鮮初級学校).

Economy
Nishoyodogawa has the headquarters of Ezaki Glico and Daifuku.

Notable people
 Hiroyuki Miyasako - comedian and voice actor

References

External links

Official website of Nishiyodogawa 

Wards of Osaka